Cigaritis avriko, the fine silverline, is a butterfly in the family Lycaenidae. It is found in Guinea (the Nimba Range), Sierra Leone (the Loma Mountains), southern Burkina Faso, Togo, Nigeria, Cameroon, Uganda, western Kenya and Ethiopia. The habitat consists of savanna.

The larvae are tended by ants of the genus Pheidole, which transport them into galls on Acacia drepanolobium in which they live. The larvae seem to feed on both ant secretions and on the lining of the galls.

References

External links
Die Gross-Schmetterlinge der Erde 13: Die Afrikanischen Tagfalter. Plate XIII 69 f

Butterflies described in 1893
Cigaritis
Butterflies of Africa